Taenia or tænia, from Greek  and Latin  (both meaning 'tape' or 'ribbon') may refer to:

Anatomy
 Taenia coli, three separate longitudinal ribbons of smooth muscle of the large intestine
 Taenia thalami, a superior surface of the thalamus of the mammal brain
 Taenia of fourth ventricle, two narrow bands of white matter of the mammal brain

Zoology
 Taenia (tapeworm), a tapeworm genus
 Cepola or Taenia, a bandfish genus
  Tinea (moth) or Taenia, a fungus moth genus
 Taenia, a Scarabaeidae genus

Other uses
 Taenia (architecture), a small fillet molding near the top of the architrave in a Doric column
 Tainia (costume) or Taenia, a ribbon worn in the hair in ancient Greece

See also
 Ribbon